Ángel Hernández (born 6 January 1995) is a Spanish-born Colombian trampoline gymnast. He competed in the 2020 Summer Olympics, where he placed ninth in men's trampoline. He was involved in a conflict with the Colombian Olympic Committee after the Olympics as he believed their lack of organization nearly led to him being stuck in Japan.
He too represented Colombia at the 2022 Pan American Gymnastics Championships where he won golden medals in team final, synchronised trampoline together with Alvaro Calero and individual trampoline.

References

1995 births
Living people
Sportspeople from Albacete
Gymnasts at the 2020 Summer Olympics
Olympic gymnasts of Colombia
Trampolinists
Pan American Games bronze medalists for Colombia
Gymnasts at the 2015 Pan American Games
Medalists at the 2015 Pan American Games
Pan American Games medalists in gymnastics
21st-century Colombian people